Dinofelis is a genus of extinct sabre-toothed cats belonging to the tribe Metailurini or possibly Smilodontini. They were widespread in Europe, Asia, Africa and North America at least 5 million to about 1.2 million years ago (Early Pliocene to Early Pleistocene). Fossils very similar to Dinofelis from Lothagam range back to the Late Miocene, some 8 million years ago.

Description and ecology
In size they were between a modern leopard and a lion, with most about the size of a jaguar (70 cm tall and up to 120 kg), they were medium-sized but powerful cats with a pair of prominent saber teeth. The front limbs were particularly robust compared to modern cats (even the jaguar).

Two specimens were examined by Serge Legendre and Claudia Roth for body mass. The first specimen was estimated to weigh , the second .

The canine teeth of Dinofelis are longer and more flattened than those of modern cats but less than those of true saber-tooths, hence the designation of Dinofelis and nimravids as "false saber-tooth" cats. (However, Nimravids are not close relatives of Dinofelis.) While the lower canines are robust, the cheek teeth are not nearly as robust as those of the lion and other modern big cats.

Based on Dinofelis''' likely preference of forest habitats, ethologist William Allen et al. believe it possessed a spotted or striped coat.

Paleobiology
Their stout body may indicate a preference for dense or mixed habitats, although, like the modern jaguar, it may have ranged from forest to open country, including wetlands.

Analysis of carbon isotope ratios in specimens from Swartkrans indicates that Dinofelis preferentially hunted grazing animals. The main predators of hominids in the environment at that time were most likely leopards and fellow machairodont Megantereon, whose carbon isotope ratios showed more indication of preying on hominids.Dinofelis fossils and bones have been found in South Africa near those of the baboons that it possibly had killed. Bones from several specimens of Dinofelis and baboons were found in a natural trap, where Dinofelis may have been lured to feed on trapped prey. Several sites from South Africa seem to show Dinofelis may have hunted and killed Australopithecus africanus, since the finds mingle fossilized remains of Dinofelis, hominids, and other large contemporary animals.  In South Africa, Dinofelis remains have been found near Paranthropus fossil skulls, a few with precisely spaced canine holes in their crania, so it is possible Dinofelis preyed on robust hominids as well. This may been rare, however, as carbon isotope ratios contradict this.

It is thought that the gradual disappearance of its forest environment may have contributed to Dinofelis extinction at the start of the ice age.

There are indications of other related species.

Taxonomy
A list of species currently accepted in the genus:
 Dinofelis aronoki: It lived in the Villafranchian and Biharian stage in Kenya and Ethiopia. Recently split from D. barlowi, it is the largest known species of Dinofelis.
 Dinofelis barlowi: It lived from the late Pliocene to the early Pleistocene. Geographically, found in Europe, North America and Asia but mainly in Africa. It was 70 cm high, probably the smallest species of Dinofelis.
 Dinofelis cristata: Known from China, this species is especially convergent with the genus Panthera in its skull and particularly canine morphology, suggesting more pantherine-like hunting behaviour than other machairodonts. (Includes D. abeli.)
 Dinofelis darti: It lived in South Africa during the Villafranchian stage.
 Dinofelis diastemata: This species is known from the early Pliocene of Europe.
 Dinofelis paleoonca Meade (1945) Its type locality is Meade's Quarry 11, which is in a Blancan terrestrial horizon in the Blanco Formation of Texas. It was recombined as Dinofelis palaeoonca by Kurten (1972), Hemmer (1973), Dalquest (1975), Kurten and Anderson (1980), Schultz (1990) and Werdelin and Lewis (2001).
 Dinofelis petteri: Known from the Pliocene of East Africa
 Dinofelis piveteaui: The latest known species of Dinofelis, lived in South Africa during the early Pleistocene. This species has the most pronounced sabertoothed adaptations of the genus.
 Dinofelis sp. "Langebaanweg"
 Dinofelis'' sp. "Lothagam"

Footnotes

References

 
 
 

Metailurini
Pliocene carnivorans
Pleistocene carnivorans
Pliocene first appearances
Pleistocene genus extinctions
Pliocene mammals of Asia
Pliocene mammals of Europe
Pliocene mammals of Africa
Pliocene mammals of North America
Pleistocene mammals of Asia
Pleistocene mammals of Europe
Pleistocene mammals of Africa
Pleistocene mammals of North America
Prehistoric carnivoran genera
Fossil taxa described in 1924
Taxa named by Otto Zdansky